Sondheim! The Birthday Concert was a concert celebrating the 80th birthday of Broadway composer Stephen Sondheim. The concert was directed by Lonny Price and hosted by David Hyde Pierce. The event was performed at Avery Fisher Hall within Lincoln Center in New York City on March 15 and 16 in 2010. The New York Philharmonic accompanied performers including Michael Cerveris, Alexander Gemignani, Joanna Gleason, Patti LuPone, Audra McDonald, Donna Murphy, Mandy Patinkin, Bernadette Peters, Elaine Stritch, and the 2009 Broadway revival cast of West Side Story.

It was broadcast as an episode of Great Performances on PBS on November 16 of the same year. A DVD of the concert was also released.

Performances 
In order of appearance

References

External links 

 Sondheim! The Birthday Concert on IMDb

2010 concerts